Freya Douglas-Morris is a landscape and figurative painter based in London.   Having graduated from the Royal College of Art with an MA Painting in 2013, her work has been featured in publications such as 'Paper' Saatchi Gallery and ‘100 Painters of Tomorrow’.  She was included in the New Contemporaries, Saatchi Art New Sensations and the Catlin Guide. She has had solo shows in London and Milan and exhibited in the US, China, Italy, France, Austria, UK.

Selected exhibitions

References

Painters from London
Alumni of the Royal College of Art
English landscape artists
Year of birth missing (living people)
Living people